Arbetarnas bildningsförbund (ABF) (the Workers' Educational Association) is the educational section of the Swedish labour movement. ABF conducts seminars, classes and study circles on a variety of subjects, including workshops, languages and music.

History 
ABF was founded on 16 November 1912, by the Swedish Social Democratic Party and some of the trade unions. Today, the main members of ABF are the Social Democrats and the Left Party.

There are ABF locations in almost every Swedish town and several in the major cities. Its headquarters are on Olof Palmes gata, near Sveavägen street in Stockholm. In Gothenburg, the ABF building is on Olof Palmes Gata, near Järntorget square.

Moa Award 
The Moa Award is an annual literary prize awarded jointly by ABF and the Moa Martinson Society to a person who writes in the spirit of Moa Martinson. The prize has been awarded since 1989.

Recipients 
1989 – Mary Andersson
1990 – Aino Trosell
1991 – Ebba Witt-Brattström
1992 – Kerstin Engman
1993 – Kerstin Ekman
1994 – Kerstin Thorvall
1995 – Majgull Axelsson
1996 – Sara Lidman
1997 – Kristina Lugn
1998 – Kjell Johansson
1999 – Elsie Johansson
2000 – Eva Adolfsson
2001 – Frida Andersson, Annika Malmborg, Martin Gerber
2002 – Rut Berggren
2003 – Anita König
2004 – Gerda Antti
2005 – Ulrika Knutson
2006 – Birgitta Holm
2007 – Suzanne Osten, Margareta Garpe, Gunnar Edander
2008 – Gunilla Nyroos
2009 – Anita Goldman
2010 – Anneli Jordahl
2011 – Gunilla Thorgren
2012 – Inger Alfvén
2013 – Susanna Alakoski
2014 – Kristina Sandberg
2015 – Agneta Pleijel
2016 – Yvonne Hirdman
2017 – Anna Jörgensdotter
2018 – Sara Stridsberg
2019 – Maj Wechselmann
2020 – Märta Tikkanen
2021 – Vibeke Olsson

References

External links
Official website 

Education in Sweden
Swedish culture
Swedish Social Democratic Party
Socialism
Socialist education
1912 establishments in Sweden
Educational institutions established in 1912